Godfrey Bingley (1842–1927) was a British photographer, engineer and iron founder.  Bingley is remarkable for the number and quality of photographs he took around the United Kingdom and abroad.

Early life 
Bingley was born on 3 July 1842 in Leeds to Godfrey Martin Bingley and Mary Walker. His father was a newspaper reporter and shorthand writer.  By 1854 the family was living with Bingley's maternal grandfather Thomas Walker and Bingley's father was in business with his father-in-law as a carpet yarn spinner.   

In 1858 Bingley became apprenticed as an engineer to his uncle John Bingley at Harper Street Foundry in Leeds.  The foundry built hydraulic presses, steam engines and other machinery.

Photography 
By the age of 42 Bingley was able to retire and developed an interest in photography and its technical capabilities. He subsequently travelled around Yorkshire and more widely around Europe and to Mexico, taking photographs which reflected his interests in geology, history and travel. Bingley's many of photographs form a record of his contemporary Yorkshire landscape. They often captured important everyday elements of contemporary life.  

In 1899 Bingley was elected to serve on the Council of the Photographic Convention of the United Kingdom, along with Alfred Horsley Hinton, Henry Peach Robinson and Henry Snowden Ward. Bingley was also elected to the Yorkshire Geological Society and became a life member.  In 1895 the Council of the Society commended Bingley for providing them with an impressive collection of photographs of geological subjects in Yorkshire.  By 1909 he was the President of the Society.

A member of the Leeds Camera Club, Bingley was in charge of a group of club photographers who took photographs for the Yorkshire Survey.  The group were asked to take images of Kirkstall Abbey for William St John Hope's 'History of Kirkstall Abbey'. Bingley showed his knowledge of the technical capabilities of photographic equipment when he commented that it was not yet capable of taking the detailed image requested by the author.

In 1910 he was living at "Thorniehurst", Shaw Lane, Headingley. Failing eyesight forced him to give up photography and in 1913 he donated his archive of around 12000 photographic negatives to the University of Leeds. He died in 1927.

Family life 
In 1878 Bingley married Elizabeth Huckvale; the couple had two daughters: Edith born in 1879 and Mary Gertrude born in 1882.

References

External links
Archival Material at Leeds University Library

1842 births
1927 deaths
British photographers
People from Leeds
History of Leeds